Gurbachan Singh Bhullar (born 18 March 1937) is a Punjabi author of short stories. In 2005, he was awarded the Sahitya Akademi Award for his short story collection Agni-Kalas.

On 11 October 2015 Bhullar joined other Punjabi writers in returning his Sahitya Akademi award to protest the assassination of M. M. Kalburgi and other liberal activists and writers.

Life
Bhullar was born in 1937 in Pitho village in district Bhatinda punjab, India. His father, Hazura Singh, was an ex-serviceman, who had a keen interest in literature and had a personal library containing works of Punjabi literature. Bhullar consequently developed a taste for literature during his early childhood.

Works

Short story collections
Agni-Kalas
Opra Mard
Vakhtan Maare
Janenee Janai Ta
Main Gaznavi Nahin
Dharti Dian Dheeian

Books
 Asa Marna Nahi
 Banere De Chirag

References

Punjabi-language writers
Recipients of the Sahitya Akademi Award in Punjabi
Indian male short story writers
1937 births
Living people
20th-century Indian short story writers
Writers from Punjab, India
20th-century Indian male writers